Ty - supermodel, Cycle 1 was the first cycle of the  Russian reality show on the STS TV channel, a competition of non-professional aspiring models. Fyodor Bondarchuk was the host of the show.

Each episode the 13 chosen finalists, who lived together in the Novohotel in Moscow, faced different competitions in modeling, sports and entertainment with an elimination round at the end of each episode where one or more of them were sent home.

When judges' favorite Sasha Oleynik placed in the bottom two in episode 4, she asked to be eliminated to free her to compete in a beauty pageant held at the same time - she was the reigning Miss Ukraine at that time - however when she was saved, Oleynik decided to quit anyway making room for Barbara Serova, who was not among the semi-finalists from episode 1. After the beauty pageant was over, Oleynik was allowed to re-enter the competition when her replacement was eliminated. Oleynik went on to achieve the second runner-up position on the show.

The winner of the competition was 17-year-old Ksenia Kahnovich won the competition and a contract worth $250,000 with Next Model Management in Paris, a cover of Cosmopolitan magazine and will be walking for Russian Silhouette fashion show.

Kahnovich has since gained a great deal of success as a model; she walked for big names such as Versace, Louis Vuitton, Christian Dior and Dolce & Gabbana in New York, Paris and Milan fashion shows.

Episode Guide

Episode 1
Original airdate: March 27, 2004

After casting calls all over Russia, the 20 semifinals arrive in the Novohotel in Moscow for their final audition in hopes of being one of the 13 finalists for the competition. After all the cellphones are removed, the girls prepare for the first test shooting in swimsuits with natural make-up and simple hair styling.

After a brief individual interview, the girls await their verdict at the very first judging panel where the general consensus is that many girls proved to have a lot of potential and seem to be able to learn what it takes to survive in the modeling business.

Olga Shekhereva is praised for the expressiveness of the mimicry of her face while Elena Umnova remains doubtful about her future in the competition due to her comparatively advanced age of 22 but sees a supporter in judge Tatiana Mikhalkova, president of the charitable foundation "Russian silhouette" who states that Umnova fits the two main things for her to be a professional model: face and figure.

Both girls are sent into the next round along with 11 others to move into the model apartment in the Novohotel while seven hopefuls are eliminated.

 Eliminated: Zarina Solovova, Olga Kashina, Anastasia Kharchenko, Ekaterina Oskina, Ekaterina Zaryvina, Nadezhda Pimenova & Elena Malchikhina

Episode 2
Original airdate: March 28, 2004

First call-out: Sasha Oleynik	
Bottom two: Olga Sandrakova & Veronika Nedorub	  	
Eliminated: Olga Sandrakova

Episode 3
Original airdate: April 3, 2004

First call-out: Ksenia Pirozhkova	
Bottom two: Elena Umnova	& Nastya Polunina	
Eliminated: Elena Umnova

Episode 4
Original airdate: April 4, 2004

First call-out: Olga Shekhereva	
Bottom two: Sasha Oleynik & Nastya Polunina 	
Eliminated: Nastya Polunina
Quit: Sasha Oleynik

Episode 5
Original airdate: April 10, 2004

Entered: Varvara Serova	
First call-out: Varvara Serova	 	
Bottom two: Ksenia Pirozhkova & Natalia Churayeva		
Eliminated: Natalia Churayeva

Episode 6
Original airdate: April 11, 2004

First call-out: Ksenia Kahnovich	 	
Bottom two: Nastya Salozubova & Olga Shekhereva		
Eliminated: Olga Shekhereva

Episode 7
Original airdate: April 17, 2004

First call-out: Ksenia Kahnovich	
Bottom two: Ksenia Pirozhkova & Veronika Nedorub	
Eliminated: Veronika Nedorub

Episode 8
Original airdate: April 18, 2004

Eliminated outside of judging panel: Varvara Serova	
Returned: Sasha Oleynik	
First call-out: Sasha Oleynik	
Bottom two: Ksenia Pirozhkova & Nastya Salozubova
Eliminated: Ksenia Pirozhkova

Episode 9
Original airdate: April 24, 2004

First call-out: Sasha Oleynik	
Bottom two: Evgenia Tolstikova & Nastya Salozubova
Eliminated: Evgenia Tolstikova & Nastya Salozubova

Episode 10
Original airdate: April 25, 2004

First call-out: Ksenia Kahnovich	
Bottom two: Yulia Oleynik & Yulia Vorobyeva	
Originally eliminated: Yulia Oleynik

Episode 11
Original airdate: May 1, 2004

Originally eliminated: Yulia Vorobyeva

Episode 12
Original airdate: May 2, 2004

Eliminated: Yulia Oleynik & Yulia Vorobyeva
Final two: Ksenia Kahnovich & Sasha Oleynik
Ty - Supermodel: Ksenia Kahnovich

Contestants
(ages stated are at start of contest)

Summaries

Call-out order

 The contestant was eliminated
 The contestant temporarily withdrew from the competition
 The contestant was eliminated outside of judging panel
 The contestant was the original eliminee but was saved
 The contestant won the competition

Photo Shoot Guide

Episode 1 Photo Shoot: Snap Shots (casting)
Episode 3 Photo Shoot: Snow Queens in Swimsuits
Episode 4 Photo Shoot: Russian jockeys in B&W
Episode 5 Photo Shoot: Wildlife
Episode 6 Photo Shoot: House of Couture
Episode 7 Photo Shoot: In The Lake
Episode 8 Photo Shoot: Cosmopolitan Covers
Episode 9 Photo Shoot: Lingerie Shoot
Episode 10 Commercial: Zapovednik mineral water commercial
Episode 11 Photo Shoot: In the Streets of St. Petersburg
Episode 12 Photo Shoot: In the boudoir with jewelry

Judges
Fyodor Bondarchuk (Host)
Elena Myasnikova
Tatiana Mikhalkova
Ellen Verbeek
Vladislav Loktev
Gianluca Causa

Post–careers

Olga Sandrakova was worked under modeling contracts abroad - Ice Models in Milan, Natalie Model Management in Riga, in Bangkok, in Kuala Lumpur, in Istanbul, in Guangzhou - and at the same time studied in absentia at the university. She decided to retired from modeling in 2007.
Natalia Churayeva continued to work on shows for some time before retired a few years later. She is currently followed in her parent's footsteps of becoming a theater actress.
Ksenia Pirozhkova continued to work on shows for some time before retired a few years later.
Nastya Salozubova was signed with Modus Vivendis Models Management. She has continued to work on shows for some time before retired from modeling in 2013.
Evgenia Tolstikova signed with Point Model Management. Tolstikova opened and closed the Roberto Cavalli shows in Moscow, participated in the Giorgio Armani show, worked with Igor Gulyaev and was the face of the Yulia Dalakyan Fashion House. In 2007, the cover of the Russian Reporter was added to Tolstikova's portfolio, where shots from Maxim and XXL magazines were already flashing. But later, she decided to take a break to open the state farm with her boyfriend for two years. She soon later returned to modeling and currently runs the Genika Models children's modeling school. 
Yulia Oleynik was signed with Grace Models, Next Model Management in Paris & London, Angel's Agency in Paris, Fashion Model Management in Milan, MC2 Model Management in Tel Aviv, View Management in Barcelona, Group Model Management in Madrid. She has collaboration with Jean-Paul Gaultier, Hermès and appear on many magazine covers and editorials like Glamour Italia, L'Officiel Russia, Collezioni Russia, Gosee, Chaos magazine. She walked in the shows of Alena Akhmadulina SS 07. She decided to retired from modeling in 2015.
Yulia Vorobyeva signed with Grace Models, President Model Management and Next Model Management in Paris. She was starred in an international advertising campaign for Garnier. She is also appear on magazine covers and runways.
Sasha Oleynik was signed with Mar-Go Model Agency in Poltava. She appear on magazine covers and editorials like L’Officel Ukraine, Maxim, Max Magazine,... and appear on many runway of Fashion Week in Moscow, Kiev, Bangkok,... Appeared on commercials and print-works like Zapodevnik mineral water, INVITO Haute Couture, Arty Cosmetics, Sanyo,... Oleynik also appeared on many pageant like Miss Model of the World 2004, Miss Young and Trendy Cover Girl 2004, Miss Tourism of the World 2005, Miss Internet WWW 2005,... 
Ksenia Kahnovich collected her prizes and appear on the cover of Cosmopolitan and although she is also receive a 3-year contract with Next Model Management, Kahnovich refuse the prize as she received an offer from IMG Models in Paris. She is also signed with Mega Model Agency in Hamburg, Priscilla's Model Management in Sydney, Ave Management in Singapore and Satoru Japan Inc. Kahnovich moved to work in Paris, Sydney, Milan and New York City. She walked in the shows of Vera Wang, Olivier Theyskens, Dolce & Gabbana, Christian Dior, Versace, Louis Vuitton, Christian Lacroix, Hermès, Gardem, Ghost, Jens Laugesen, Nicole Farhi, Camilla Staerk, Jenny Packham, Jens Laugesen, Julien McDonald, ... Kahnovich has several covers for Madam Figaro, Harper's Bazaar Singapore, Madame Figaro Singapore,... She is also been shooting for Lanvin and Versace, work with Dolce & Gabbana, Gucci, John Richmond, Carolina Herrera and many others. In 2012, Kahnovich decided to take a break and get an education in furniture and interior design at the International Academy of Design in Florence at the Faculty of Industrial Design. She decided to retired from modeling in 2014.

References

Official website though internet archive

Top Model series (Russia)
2004 Russian television seasons